Wellington was a rural district in Somerset, England, from 1894 to 1974.

It was created in 1894 under the Local Government Act 1894.

In 1974 it was abolished under the Local Government Act 1972 when it became part of Taunton Deane.

The parishes which were included in the district included Ashbrittle, Bathealton, Bradford on Tone, Chipstable, Fitzhead, Langford Budville, Milverton, Nynehead, Oake, Sampford Arundel, Stawley, Wellington Without, West Buckland and Wiveliscombe.

References

Wellington Rural District at Britain Through Time
Local Government Act 1972

Districts of England created by the Local Government Act 1894
Districts of England abolished by the Local Government Act 1972
History of Somerset
Local government in Somerset
Rural districts of England
Wellington, Somerset